Jewels! The Glitter of the Russian Court was the second jubileum exhibition in Amsterdam by the Hermitage Amsterdam, focussed on the personal taste for luxury by Russian nobility. The show, which was planned to run from 14 September 2019 to 15 March 2020, suffered from the pandemic and was extended twice, ending finally 16 October 2020.

The main theme of the exhibition, jewelry, was loosely grouped into categories: personal jewelry for balls, show jewelry for treasury displays of the nobility, jewelry for children, men, weddings, mourning dress and finally, the end of an era, or fin-de siècle. Each category was shown in context of other clothing, accessories and furniture through paintings. The time periods ranged roughly from 1700-1900. The entrance to the exhibition began with two formal jackets for court balls, one for a chamberlain, and one for a princess with a long train. Besides a few specifically named loan items, everything on show was from the Hermitage collections in St. Petersburg.

Ballroom

In the central ballroom, a helpful Romanov family tree showed miniature versions of the portraits on display. Viewing the clothing of the rulers in their portraits helps to put their jewelry in context. They are portrayed wearing their ermine-lined mantles with lots of prominent jewelry, and some portraits show pieces which can be traced from one generation to the next. They are seen wearing a star or badge of the order of St Andrew.

Non-royal portraits also lined the walls. These were court ball attendees wearing the style of nearby clothing and accessories on display. For example, the portraits of Arkady Telyakovsky and his wife Julia Kanshina show how the clothing and accessories were worn in the mid-19th century. Arkady is wearing a dress uniform with silver buttons and silver epaulets. On his chest can be seen several military honors. Julia carries a porte-bouquet and wears several bracelets at once, and one of them has a miniature portrait of her husband.

The dresses were often designed with accessories in mind, and some examples of matching shoes were on display.

Treasury room

The second major display room held objects created by jewelers which were treasured as sculptures. Many unusual snuffboxes were probably collected by Catherine II. The main attraction was a bouquet made of gems meant to be worn as a corsage, though the bodice of the dress to bear it would need to be very strong to carry it. Today it is displayed in a vase.

Upstairs

Overshadowing the opulence is the awareness that it all ended abruptly, and a mural gave a short discussion of the losses due to the execution of the Romanov family during the 1917 revolution. In the same walkway, two court jewelers were on display, both of whom probably made works that were later sold off by the Bolsheviks.

Catherine the Great
A display with items belonging to Catherine the Great showed some items from her gold toilet set which contains 46 pieces. The most remarkable personal item was a wig made of silver thread and a mid 1700s court dress.

Children

Court dress for children was just as extravagant as for adults. It is unknown whether they were allowed to play in such clothes however.

Weddings
Various Russian wedding traditions were explained, most notably the usage of turquoise in jewellery. In the ballroom were two bracelets on loan from the Dutch Royal collection. These show Anna Pauwlowna's Russian heritage and have the bride and groom's braided hair behind their initials and their names in turquoise.

Gentlemen
Men's jewelry on show was either military awards, or functional objects such as watches and smoking paraphernalia.

Mourning
A remarkable tradition was wearing human hair of the deceased.

Fin-de-siècle

The main attraction of the Fin-de-siècle display room was the Fabergé diadem, that was placed on a rotating turntable to show how much it caught the light while the dangling parts moved.

Ambassadors
Three Dutch fashion designers were ambassadors for this exhibition, who visited the Hermitage in Saint Petersburg and chose items there that inspired them and which they felt should be in the show. Their individual stories became part of the accompanying audiotour for the three items they selected, and one item by each was on show in the final room of the exhibition.

 Bibi van der Velden, a Dutch jewelry designer, was inspired by the show items by Russian court jewelers that display their craft in ways that explore material use as well as visual references. She selected a Neptune sculpture from circa 1600 that was placed on show in the "Treasury" room. She made a flamboyant double ring glittering with many of the gemstone types used in the original sculpture. 

 Edwin Oudshoorn, a Dutch dress designer, was inspired by colors and deliberate marks of decay on a diamond-studded fin-de-siècle brooch in the form of a blooming orchid. He designed a dress using similar colors. It left the exhibition for one day because it was being worn. 

 Jan Taminiau, a Dutch dress designer, was inspired by a parure of gold filigree gems and papier-mâché cameos that had been a wedding gift to the older sister of Anna Paulowna, Grand Duchess Alexandra Pavlovna. Though made of gold and covered in diamonds, the main decoration of the parure is a set of cameos that were possibly made by the bride's mother in tandem with court jewelers.  His "Mail bag jacket", one of his early creations worn by Queen Maxima of the Netherlands, was on loan for the show.

References

Juwelen!, article about the exhibition and three loaned bracelets from the Dutch Royal collection on their website
Tour of the show during lockdown on YouTube (in Dutch) by the (then) director of Hermitage Amsterdam, Cathelijne Broers
Jewels! The Glitter of the Russian Court in the Hermitage Amsterdam website
Jewels! The Glitter of the Russian Court, catalogue by Olga Kosti︠u︡k, Ekaterina Abramova, Martijn Akkerman, Larisa Peshekhonova, Julia Plotnikova, 2019
Europe’s Museums Are Open, but the Public Isn’t Coming, by Nina Siegal, New York Times, 19 October 2020

Art exhibitions in the Netherlands
Jewellery
Collection of the Hermitage Museum
2020 in art
2020 in the Netherlands